DateIITians is an online social dating and networking website, founded January 2, 2012.  It was shut down due to technical and scalability issues.  It relaunched in 2015 exclusively for Elite Singles in India from IIT, IIM, DCE, BITS, NIT, IIIT, IISc and all Ivy League universities. It also opened this time for doctors, lawyers, CXO, Entrepreneurs, Startups, and all senior level employees.

History
DateIITians, a dating and matchmaking website, launched on 22 January 2012 after being founded by Layak Singh, Kinshuk Bairagi and Nikhil Kaushik from IIT Kharagpur. The website offers the sharing of photos, videos, links and ideas, live chat, video chat, customized user profiles, notifications, private messaging, matchmaking suggestions based on an algorithm with like-minded people, beauty contests and games. To encourage users to sign up for the website, DateIITians held an online competition, Who will be your Valentine?, in February 2012.

The site has more than 20,000+ monthly users. In June 2014, the website shut down. The site re-launched on 14 May 2016.

Media
In January 2012, the site was featured in Times of India. In May 2012 Firstpost described it as “Divine indeed!

Criticisms
The website only allowed users who provide specific identity proof to maintain the authenticity of each profile.

References

External links
 dateIITians Official website

Online dating services of India